Denise Moore (sometimes reported as Deniz Moore), was the pseudonym of Jane Wright (1876 – 21 July 1911), an aviation pioneer. She was the first known female aviator to die in a flight accident.

Biography 
Jane Wright is believed to have been of British ancestry and born in Algiers, Algeria. Before coming to metropolitan France in 1911, she lived in Algiers, then a part of France. She was the widow of Denis Cornesson. She flew in France under the name Denise Moore to hide her flying career from her family.

After three weeks of flight training, Wright died on 21 July 1911 in Étampes, France when she fell 150 feet from an inverted aircraft, an accident that occurred when she attempted to gain more altitude than had been recommended by her instructor. She was the first woman aviator to die in a plane accident. At the time, she was learning to fly at the Henry Farman Aviation School.

See also
List of firsts in aviation

References

External links 
 Contemporary article (in French) describing in detail the circumstances of the accident.

1876 births
1911 deaths
Aviation history of France
Aviation pioneers
Aviators killed in aviation accidents or incidents in France
Victims of aviation accidents or incidents in 1911
Women aviators